Jay Overmeer (born December 1, 1996) is a Dutch kickboxer, currently competing in the welterweight division of Glory. As of December 2022, he is ranked as the tenth best welterweight kickboxer in the world by Beyond Kick and Combat Press.

Kickboxing career

Early career
Overmeer faced the future Glory middleweight champion Donovan Wisse at World Fighting League 5 : Champions vs. Champions on April 23, 2017. He lost the fight by unanimous decision.

Overmeer took part in the 2017 World Fighting League welterweight tournament, which was held on October 29, 2017. He captured the tournament title with unanimous decision victories over Abdelmouniem Mouyah in the semifinal and Darryl Sichtman in the final.

Overmeer participated in the 2019 King of Kings welterweight tournament. He was eliminated in the semifinals of the one-day tournament, as he lost to Ekrem Doruk by a narrow split decision, after an extra fourth round was contested. Overmeer faced the eventual tournament winner Chico Kwasi two years later, at a May 21, 2021, WFL event. He won the fight by unanimous decision, after knocking Kwasi down with a head kick.

Overmeerfaced Haris Biber at the August 21, 2021, World Fighting League event. He won the fight by a third-round technical knockout, as the in-ring official waved the fight off, judging Biber to have sustained too much damage. It was later revealed by Biber that he had suffered a broken nose and jaw.

Overmeer was booked to face the two-weight Enfusion champion Endy Semeleer for the inaugural Enfusion World Welterweight (-77kg) Championship at Enfusion #104 on November 12, 2021. He lost the fight by unanimous decision.

Glory
Overmeer made his Glory debut against Jos van Belzen at Glory 80 on March 19, 2022. He won the fight by technical knockout, after thrice knocking van Belzen down in the second round.

Overmeer faced Rodrigo Mineiro in his next Glory appearance, at Glory Rivals 1 on June 11, 2022. He won the fight by a first-round knockout, stopping Mineiro with a well-placed knee strike.

Overmeer faced the former former Enfusion 80 kg champion Robin Ciric at Glory Rivals 3 on November 5, 2022. He won the fight by unanimous decision.

Overmeer faced Jamie Bates at Glory 84 on March 11, 2023. He won the fight by a second-round technical knockout, after thrice knocking Bates down by the 2:42 minute mark of the round.

Championships and accomplishments
World Fighting League
2017 WFL Welterweight (-77 kg) Tournament Winner
2019 WFL Welterweight (-77 kg) Championship

Kickboxing record

|-  style="background:#cfc;"
| 2023-03-11 || Win ||align=left| Jamie Bates || Glory 84 || Rotterdam, Netherlands || TKO (Three knockdowns) || 2||2:42

|- style="background:#cfc;"
| 2022-11-05 || Win ||align=left| Robin Ciric || Glory Rivals 3 || Amsterdam, Netherlands || Decision (Unanimous) || 3 || 3:00
|-
|- style="background:#cfc;"
| 2022-06-11 || Win ||align=left| Rodrigo Mineiro || Glory Rivals 1 || Alkmaar, Netherlands || KO (Knee) || 2 || 0:55
|-
|- style="background:#cfc;"
| 2022-03-19 || Win ||align=left| Jos van Belzen || Glory 80 || Hasselt, Belgium || TKO (3 knockdowns) || 2 || 2:47
|-
|- style="background:#fbb;"
| 2021-11-12 || Loss ||align=left| Endy Semeleer || Enfusion 104 || Abu Dhabi, United Arab Emirates || Decision (Unanimous) || 5 || 3:00
|-
! style=background:white colspan=9 |
|-
|- style="background:#cfc;"
| 2021-08-22 || Win ||align=left| Haris Biber || World Fight League || Netherlands || TKO (Referee's stoppage) || 3 || 
|-
|- style="background:#cfc;"
| 2021-05-15 || Win ||align=left| Chico Kwasi || World Fight League || Netherlands || Decision (Unanimous) || 3 || 3:00 
|-
|- style="background:#fbb;"
| 2019-11-30|| Loss ||align=left| Ekrem Doruk || KOK World Series 2019 Germany, Welterweight Tournament Semifinals || Krefeld, Germany || Ext. R. Decision (Split) || 4 || 3:00
|-
|- style="background:#cfc;"
| 2019-02-17 || Win ||align=left| Darryl Sichtman || WFL Final 8 || Alkmaar, Netherlands || Decision (Unanimous) || 3 || 3:00
|-
! style=background:white colspan=9 |
|-
|- style="background:#cfc;"
| 2018-03-25 || Win ||align=left| Fernando Groenhart || WFL Final 8 || Alkmaar, Netherlands || Decision (Unanimous) || 3 || 3:00
|-
|- style="background:#cfc;"
| 2017-10-29 || Win ||align=left| Darryl Sichtman || WFL Final 16, Welterweight Tournament Finals || Alkmaar, Netherlands || Decision (Unanimous) || 3 || 3:00
|-
! style=background:white colspan=9 |
|-
|- style="background:#cfc;"
| 2017-10-29 || Win ||align=left| Abdelmouniem Mouyah || WFL Final 16, Welterweight Tournament Semifinals || Alkmaar, Netherlands || Decision (Unanimous) || 3 || 3:00
|-
|- style="background:#fbb;"
| 2017-04-23 || Loss ||align=left| Donovan Wisse || World Fighting League 5 : Champions vs. Champions || Netherlands || Decision (Unanimous) || 3 || 3:00
|-
|- style="background:#cfc;"
| 2017-03-19 || Win ||align=left| Kenneth Susanna || Fight Time Haarlem || Haarlem, Netherlands || Decision (Unanimous) || 3 || 3:00
|-
|- style="background:#cfc;"
| 2016-10-16 || Win ||align=left| Amine Doudou ||  ACB KB 8: Only The Braves || Hoofddorp, Netherlands || Decision ||  3||3:00
|-
|- style="background:#fbb;"
| 2016-04-03 || Loss ||align=left| Tom Duivenvoorden || World Fighting League || Hoofddorp, Netherlands || Decision || 3 || 3:00
|-
|- style="background:#fbb;"
| 2016-03-05 || Loss ||align=left| Marino Schouten || House of Pain 2016 || Alkmaar, Netherlands || Decision (Unanimous) || 3 || 3:00
|-
|- style="background:#cfc;"
| 2015-11-14 || Win ||align=left| Serginio Kruydenhof || Final RINGS League, Final || Aalsmeer, Netherlands || Decision || 3 || 3:00 

|- style="background:#cfc;"
| 2015-11-14 || Win ||align=left| Mark Trijsburg || Final RINGS League, Semi Final || Aalsmeer, Netherlands || TKO (Punches) || 2 || 

|- style="background:#cfc;"
| 2015-04-12 || Win ||align=left| Onur Sahin || World Fighting League || Hoofddorp, Netherlands || Decision (Unanimous) || 3 || 3:00
|-
|-
|- style="background:#cfc;"
| 2014-09-27 || Win ||align=left| Rushad Moradi || SuperKombat World Grand Prix IV 2014 || Alkmaar, Netherlands || Decision (Unanimous) || 3 || 3:00
|-
| colspan=9 | Legend:

See also
 List of male kickboxers

References

1996 births
21st-century people
21st-century Dutch people
Dutch male kickboxers
Glory kickboxers
Sportspeople from Amsterdam
Welterweight kickboxers
Living people